Ragazza di periferia is the second album from Italian singer Anna Tatangelo. The album was re-released in March 2006 with two new tracks: "Essere una donna" (winner in the women's category at the 2006 Sanremo Music Festival) and "Colpo di fulmine".

Track listing

Re-release track listing

Musicians
 Anna Tatangelo - vocals
 Maurizio Fiordiliso - guitar, backing vocals
 Adriano Pennino - keyboards, piano, programming
 Roberto D'Aquino - bass
 Biagio Sturiale - electric guitar
 Giordano Moretti - keyboards, programming
 Luca Chiaravalli - keyboards, programming
 Paolo Costa - bass
 Alfredo Golino - drums
 Cesare Chiodo - bass
 Rossella Ruini - backing vocals
 Fabrizio Palma - backing vocals
 Valeria Guida - backing vocals
 Michela Montalto - backing vocals

Singles
 "Ragazza di periferia" (2005)
 "Quando due si lasciano" (2005)
 "Qualcosa di te" (2005)
 "Essere una donna" (2006)
 "Colpo di fulmine" (2006)

References

2005 albums
Anna Tatangelo albums